A torque to yield fastener (TTY) or stretch bolt is a fastener which is torqued beyond the state of elasticity and therefore undergoes plastic deformation, causing it to become permanently elongated.

Fastener
Torquing a fastener to its yield point results in a high preloading of the fastener which, depending on the load frequency and amplitude, can significantly increase the fatigue life of the fastener. When the applied load doesn't surpass the clamping force of the fastener, the strain of the fastener will be lower than when the preloading is smaller than the applied load. It is therefore beneficial in high-frequency high-load situations with a higher risk of fatigue related failure, like a bolted down cylinder head, to use torque to yield bolts.

 Advantage: Compared to normally tightened hardware, a smaller TTY bolt/screw may be used while still maintaining the same clamping force.
 Disadvantage: TTY hardware normally has to be replaced when loosened, for example when the cylinder head is removed.

References 

Fasteners